Caer en tentación (English: Fall Into Temptation) is a Mexican telenovela produced by Giselle González for Televisa, and it started airing on Mexican broadcast channel Las Estrellas on 18 September 2017, and concluded on 11 February 2018. Based on the Argentine drama by Erika Halvorsen and Gonzalo Demaría, titled Amar después de amar. The series stars Silvia Navarro, Gabriel Soto, Adriana Louvier, and Carlos Ferro.

Plot summary 
Raquel (Silvia Navarro) and Damián (Gabriel Soto) are happily married with two children. Destiny leads Damián to meet Carolina (Adriana Louvier) and feels an undeniable attraction towards her. Damián did not know that Carolina was already married to Santiago Álvarado (Carlos Ferro), a construction architect with whom she has two children. When Raquel drops off her son Fede at school, she accidentally backs her car to Santiago's truck, and they realize that their sons know each other. Raquel volunteers to pay for the damages but Santiago refuses. Raquel insists and goes to the Álvarado home with Damián. The two couples become great friends. But the desire between Damián and Carolina is stronger than their marriage commitment and both decide to deceive to their spouses. Damián and Carolina have a terrible car accident. Rescuers only find a seriously injured Damián, and Carolina has mysteriously disappeared from the scene. During the investigation by the police, Raquel and Santiago learn that their spouses are lovers.

Cast

Main 
 Silvia Navarro as Raquel Cohen
 Gabriel Soto as Damián Becker
 Adriana Louvier as Carolina Rivas
 Carlos Ferro as Santiago Álvarado
 Arath de la Torre as Andrés Becker
 Julieta Egurrola as Miriam de Becker
 Beatriz Moreno as Jovita 
 Ela Velden as Mía Becker Cohen
 Julia Urbini as Dolores "Lola" Álvarado Rivas
 Luz Ramos as Laura
 Carlos Valencia as Vicente Rivas
 Enoc Leaño as Rodolfo Rueda
 Irineo Álvarez as Antonio
 Adalberto Parra as Nacho
 Luis Fernando Peña as Agustín
 Ana Ciocchetti as Azucena
 Jorge Luis Vázquez as Godoy
 Moisés Arizmendi as Cristian
 Liz Gallardo as Gabriela
 Germán Bracco as Federico "Fede" Becker Cohen
 José Manuel Rincón as Nicolas "Nico" Álvarado Rivas
 Francisco Pizaña as Juan Durán
 Pierre Louis as Bebo
 Andrea Guerrero as Cynthia
 Nicole Vale as Julieta

Recurring 
 Erika de la Rosa as Alina del Villar
 Monserrat Marañón as Lisa
 Jorge de los Reyes as Rafael

Production 
Production started on July 3, 2017. In May 2017, the production began with the title "Nadie más en el mundo", later in June 2017 his title was changed to "Pasiones ocultas", finally the 4 of July 2017 confirms that the official title would be "Caer en tentación".

Episodes

Ratings

Mexico ratings 
 
}}

U.S. ratings

Awards and nominations

Notes

References

External links 

Mexican telenovelas
Televisa telenovelas
2017 telenovelas
2017 Mexican television series debuts
2018 Mexican television series endings
Mexican television series based on Argentine television series
Spanish-language telenovelas